Polyrhachis gibbosa is a species of ant in the subfamily Formicinae, found in Sri Lanka.

References

External links

 at antwiki.org
Animaldiversity.org
Itis.org

Formicinae
Hymenoptera of Asia
Insects described in 1908